Teza Lawrence is a Canadian producer and television writer. She also earned a nomination for the Genie Award for Best Motion Picture for Saint Ralph. She is the Executive Producer and Co-President of Amaze Film and Television. She has worked as an executive producer for the TV shows Call Me Fitz, The Stanley Dynamic, and the 2018 series Carter (TV series).

References

External links
 

Canadian film producers
Canadian television directors
Canadian television producers
Canadian women television producers
Canadian television writers
Canadian women television writers
Living people
Year of birth missing (living people)
Place of birth missing (living people)
Canadian women screenwriters
Canadian women film producers
Canadian women television directors